Li Xiang (born 17 January 1991) is a Chinese footballer currently playing as a forward for Tianjin Jinmen Tiger.

Career statistics

Club
.

References

1991 births
Living people
Chinese footballers
Association football forwards
China League One players
China League Two players
Chinese Super League players
Tianjin Jinmen Tiger F.C. players
Shenyang Dongjin F.C. players
Hunan Billows players
Beijing Sport University F.C. players